Dalovice is a municipality and village in Karlovy Vary District in the Karlovy Vary Region of the Czech Republic. It has about 1,900 inhabitants.

Administrative parts
Villages of Všeborovice and Vysoká are administrative parts of Dalovice.

Notable people
Anton Dietz (1888–1960), Austrian Righteous Among the Nations

References

Villages in Karlovy Vary District